In 2011, the Campeonato Brasileiro Série B, the second level of the Brazilian League, will be contested by 20 clubs from May 20 until November 26, 2011. Top four teams in the table will qualify to the Campeonato Brasileiro Série A to be contested in 2012, meanwhile the bottom four will be relegated to Série C next season.

Format
For the sixth consecutive season, the tournament will be played in a double round-robin system. The team with most points will be declared champions. Top four clubs will ascend to Série A, meanwhile the bottom four will be relegated to Série C.

Team information

Standings

Results

References

Campeonato Brasileiro Série B seasons
2
Brazil